Brazil competed at the 1952 Summer Olympics in Helsinki, Finland. 97 competitors, 92 men and 5 women, took part in 51 events in 14 sports. Brazil won three medals at the 1952 Summer Olympics. Brazil won its first gold medal since its debut at the 1920 Summer Olympics. 
Adhemar Ferreira da Silva won the men's triple jump. Together with the bronze medal won by José Telles da Conceição in men's high jump; those were the first medals won by Brazilians at Athletics in the Olympic Games. Tetsuo Okamoto became the first Brazilian swimmer to win an Olympic medal, the bronze at the men's 1500 metre freestyle.

Medalists

Athletics

Men
Track & road events

Field events

Women
Track & road events

Field events

Basketball

Main tournament

Group 3

|}

Quarterfinals
The top two teams in each quarterfinals advanced to the semifinals.  The other two teams in each quarterfinals played in the fifth through eighth place classification.

Quarterfinals group B

|}

Semifinals

Finals

Team Roster
Algodão
Angelo Bonfietti
João Francisco Bráz
Mayr Facci
Mário Jorge
Ruy de Freitas
Sebastião Giménez
Godinho
Thales Monteiro
Almir
Alfredo da Motta
Raymundo Carvalho
Zé Luiz
Head coach: Manoel Pitanga

Boxing

Men

Diving

Men

Equestrian

Eventing

Show jumping

Fencing

Five fencers, all men, represented Brazil in 1952.

Men's épée
 César Pekelman
 Darío Amaral
 Walter de Paula

Men's team épée
 Darío Amaral, César Pekelman, Walter de Paula, Helio Vieira

Men's sabre
 Etienne Molnar

Football

 Preliminary round

 First round

 Quarter-finals

Modern pentathlon

Three male pentathletes represented Brazil in 1952.
Men

Rowing

Brazil had three male rowers participate in one out of seven rowing events in 1952.

Men

Sailing

Open

Shooting

Eight shooters represented Brazil in 1952.
Men

Swimming

Men

Women

Water polo

Qualifying round

Preliminary round

Group D

|}

Weightlifting

Men

References

External links
Official Olympic Reports
International Olympic Committee results database

Nations at the 1952 Summer Olympics
1952
1952 in Brazilian sport